The William Gabbert House is a historic building located on the east side of Davenport, Iowa, United States. The structure is one of the last remaining Gothic Revival houses left in Davenport. The cross-gabled roof with the steep pitch and the small wall dormer are its distinguishable features. The chamfered corners on the windows and the diamond-shaped windows on the dormer and gable ends contributes to its sense of verticality. The Colonial Revival porch was added sometime in the 1890s and diminishes its impact. The house has been listed on the National Register of Historic Places since 1983.

References

Houses completed in 1873
Gothic Revival architecture in Iowa
Houses in Davenport, Iowa
Houses on the National Register of Historic Places in Iowa
National Register of Historic Places in Davenport, Iowa